Little Malcolm is a 1974 British comedy drama film directed by Stuart Cooper. It was entered into the 24th Berlin International Film Festival where it won the Silver Bear.

The film is based on the stage play Little Malcolm and His Struggle Against the Eunuchs by David Halliwell. The full name of the play is used as the film title on the BFI Flipside 2011 DVD release.

Plot
Malcolm Scrawdyke, a fascist political figure, plots revenge against the college that expelled him by forming the Party of Dynamic Erection, a right-wing political movement, with three acolytes.

Cast
 Rosalind Ayres as Ann Gedge
 John Hurt as Malcolm Scrawdyke
 John McEnery as Wick Blagdon
 Raymond Platt as Irwin Ingham
 David Warner as Dennis Charles Nipple

Production
An Apple Films project, Little Malcolm was the first feature film produced by former Beatle George Harrison. The film was shot primarily in Lancashire, in the north of England, during February and March 1973. Harrison supplied incidental music for the soundtrack and, after being introduced to the duo Splinter by their manager Mal Evans, produced their song "Lonely Man" for inclusion in a pivotal scene.

Like many of Apple's film and recording projects, production on Little Malcolm was then jeopardised by lawsuits pertaining to Harrison, John Lennon and Ringo Starr's severing of ties with manager Allen Klein. Speaking in 2011, Cooper said that Harrison "fought for a very long time to extract Little Malcolm from the official receivers", adding that its entry in the Berlin festival was only possible because the festival was an artistic forum and not finance-related. After what Cooper described as an "incredible" reception at Berlin for "this very British film", Little Malcolm went on to win a gold medal at the Atlanta Film Festival in August 1974.

Once the Beatles' partnership had been formally dissolved, in January 1975, the film received a brief run in London's West End. In February 1983, Harrison donated his personal copy of Little Malcolm to a New York-based company for screening at a local film festival.

Soundtrack
The soundtrack featured the band Harpoon singing "Not With You".

References

Sources

 Keith Badman, The Beatles Diary Volume 2: After the Break-Up 1970–2001, Omnibus Press (London, 2001).
 Alan Clayson, George Harrison, Sanctuary (London, 2003).
 Peter Doggett, You Never Give Me Your Money: The Beatles After the Breakup, It Books (New York, NY, 2011).
 Bob Woffinden, The Beatles Apart, Proteus (London, 1981).

External links

1974 films
1974 comedy-drama films
1974 comedy films
1974 drama films
1974 independent films
British films based on plays
British comedy-drama films
Films directed by Stuart Cooper
Films scored by Stanley Myers
British independent films
Apple Films films
Films shot in Greater Manchester
1970s English-language films
1970s British films